Slavery in the Spanish American colonies was an economic and social institution which existed throughout the Spanish Empire including Spain itself. In its American territories, Spain displayed an early abolitionist stance towards indigenous people, although some instances of illegal Native American slavery continued to be practiced, particularly until the New Laws of 1543. The Spanish empire, however was involved in the enslavement of people of African origin. Although the Spanish often depended on others to obtain enslaved Africans and transport them across the Atlantic, the Spanish Empire was a major recipient of enslaved Africans, with around 22% of the Africans delivered to American shores ending up in the Spanish Empire. Asian people (chinos) in colonial Mexico were also taken from the Philippines and enslaved. They were taken to Acapulco by Novohispanic ships and sold. 

The Spanish restricted and outright forbade the enslavement of Native Americans from the early years of the Spanish Empire with the Laws of Burgos of 1512 and the New Laws of 1542. The latter led to the abolition of the Encomienda,  private grants of groups of Native Americans to individual Spaniards as well as to Native American nobility. The implementation of the New Laws and liberation of tens of thousands of Native Americans led to a number of rebellions and conspiracies by "Encomenderos" (Encomienda holders) which had to be put down by the Spanish crown.

Spain had a precedent for slavery as an institution since it had existed in Spain itself since the times of the Roman Empire. Slavery also existed among Native Americans of both Meso-America and South America. The Crown attempted to limit the bondage of indigenous people, rejecting forms of slavery based on race. Conquistadors regarded indigenous forced labor and tribute as rewards for participation in the conquest and the Crown gave some conquerors encomiendas. The indigenous people held in encomienda were not slaves, but their underpaid labor was mandatory and coerced, while they had rights and could take to trial to their managers, and they were "cared for" by the person in whose charge they were placed (encomendado), this might mean offering them the Christian religion and other perceived (by the Spaniards) benefits of Christian civilization. With the collapse of indigenous populations in the Caribbean, where Spaniards created permanent settlements starting in 1493, Spaniards raided other islands and the mainland for indigenous people to enslave on Hispaniola. With the rise of sugar cultivation as an export product in 1810, Spaniards increasingly utilized enslaved African people for labor on commercial plantations. Although plantation slavery in Spanish America was one aspect of slave labor, urban slavery in households, religious institutions, textile workshops (obrajes), and other venues was also important.

Spanish slavery in the Americas diverged from other European powers in that it took on an early abolitionist stance towards Native American slavery. Although it did not directly partake in the trans-Atlantic slave trade, enslaved Black people were sold throughout the Spanish Empire, particularly in Caribbean territories. During the colonial period, Spanish territories were the most extensive and wealthiest in the Americas. Since Spaniards themselves were barred by the Crown from participating in the Atlantic slave trade, the right to export slaves in these territories, known as the Asiento de Negros was a major foreign policy objective of other European powers, sparking numerous European wars such as the War of Spanish Succession and the War of Jenkin's Ear. In the mid-nineteenth century when most countries in the Americas reformed to disallow chattel slavery, Cuba and Puerto Rico – the last two remaining Spanish American colonies – were among the last, followed only by Brazil.

Enslaved people challenged their captivity in ways that ranged from introducing non-European elements into Christianity (syncretism) to mounting alternative societies outside the plantation (slave labour camp) system (Maroons). The first open Black rebellion occurred in Spanish labour camps (plantations) in 1521. Resistance, particularly to the enslavement of indigenous people, also came from Spanish religious and legal ranks.  The first speech in the Americas for the universality of human rights and against the abuses of slavery was also given on Hispaniola, a mere nineteen years after the first contact. Resistance to indigenous captivity in the Spanish colonies produced the first modern debates over the legitimacy of slavery. And uniquely in the Spanish American colonies, laws like the New Laws of 1542, were enacted early in the colonial period to protect natives from bondage. To complicate matters further, Spain's haphazard grip on its extensive American dominions and its erratic economy acted to impede the broad and systematic spread of plantations operated by slave labor. Altogether, the struggle against slavery in the Spanish American colonies left a notable tradition of opposition that set the stage for conversations about human rights.

Iberian precedents to New World slavery

Slavery in Spain can be traced to the times of the Greeks, Phoenicians and Romans. Slavery was cross-cultural and multi-ethnic" and, in addition to that, slavery played an important role in the development of the economy for Spain and other countries. 

The Romans extensively utilized slavery for labor and slaves' status was specified in the Code of Justinian. With the rise of Christianity, the status of was altered in that Christians were in theory banned from enslaving fellow Christians, but the practice persisted. With the rise of Islam, and the conquest of most of the Iberian peninsula in the eighth century, slavery declined in remaining Iberian Christian kingdoms. At the time of the formation of Al-Andalus, Muslims were prohibited from enslaving fellow believers, but there was a slave trade of non-Muslims in which Muslims and local Jewish merchants traded in Spanish and Eastern European Christian slaves. Mozarabs and Jews were allowed to remain and retain their slaves if they paid a head tax for themselves and half-value for the slaves. However, non-Muslims were prohibited from holding Muslim slaves, and so if one of their slaves converted to Islam, they were required to sell the slave to a Muslim. Mozarabs were later, by the 9th and 10th centuries, permitted to purchase new non-Muslim slaves via the peninsula's established slave trade.

During the reconquista, Christian Spain sought to retake territory lost to Muslims and this led to changing norms regarding slavery. Though enslavement of Christians was originally permitted, over the period from the 8th to the 11th centuries the Christian kingdoms gradually ceased this practice, limiting their pool of slaves to Muslims from Al-Andalus. Conquered Muslims were enslaved with the justification conversion and acculturation, but Muslim captives were often offered back to their families and communities for cash payments (rescate). The thirteenth-century code of law, the Siete Partidas of Alfonso "the learned" (1252–1284) specified who could be enslaved: those who were captured in just war; offspring of an enslaved mother; those who voluntarily sold themselves into slavery, and specified slaves' good treatment by their masters. At the time it was generally domestic slavery and was a temporary condition of members of outgroups. As well as the formal parameters for slavery, the Siete Partidas also makes a value judgment, stating that it "was the basest and most wretched condition into which anyone could fall because man, who is the freest noble of all God's creatures, becomes thereby in the power of another, who can do with him what he wishes as with any property, whether living or dead."

As the Spanish (Castilians) and Portuguese expanded overseas, they conquered and occupied Atlantic islands off the north coast of Africa, including the Canary Islands as well as São Tomé and Madeira where they introduced plantation sugar cultivation.  They considered the indigenous populations there more animal than human, supposedly justifying their enslavement.  The Canary Islands came under Castilian control, and by the early sixteenth century the indigenous population had largely been decimated and African slave labor replaced indigenously. Multiple West African states were participants in slave raiding and trading, and the slaves the Castilians purchased were considered legitimate slaves. Slave-trading African states accepted a variety of European goods, including firearms, horses, and other desirable goods in exchange for slaves.

Both the Spanish and the Portuguese colonized the Atlantic islands off the coast of Africa, where they engaged in sugar cane production following the model of Mediterranean production. The sugar complex consisted of slave labor for cultivation and processing, with the sugar mill (ingenio) and equipment established with significant investor capital.  When plantation slavery was established in Spanish America and Brazil, they replicated the elements of the complex in the New World on a much larger scale.

The Portuguese exploration of the African coast and the division of overseas territories via the Treaty of Tordesillas meant that the African slave trade was held by the Portuguese. However, demand for African slaves as the Spanish established themselves in the Caribbean meant that became part of the Spanish Empire's social mosaic. Black slaves in Spain were overwhelmingly domestic servants, and increasingly became prestigious property for elite Spanish households though at a much smaller scale than the Portuguese.  Artisans acquired black slaves and trained them in their trade, increasing the artisans' output.

Another form of forced labor used in the New World with origins in Spain was the encomienda, on the model of the award of the labor to Christian victors over Muslims during the reconquista. This institution of forced labor was initially employed by the Spaniards in the Canary Islands following their conquest, but the Guanche (Canarian) population precipitously declined. The institution as an institution was much more widespread following the Spanish contact and conquests in Mexico and Peru, but the precedents were set prior to 1492.

Legal status of forced labor of indigenous peoples

Prior to the Spanish colonization of the Americas, slavery was a common institution among some Pre-Columbian indigenous peoples, particularly the Aztecs. The Spanish conquest and settlement in the New World quickly led to large-scale subjugation of indigenous peoples, mainly of the Native Caribbean people, by Columbus on his four voyages. Initially, forced labor represented a means by which the conquistadores mobilized native labor, with disastrous effects on the population. Unlike the Portuguese Crown's support for the slave trade in Africa, los Reyes Católicos opposed the enslavement of the native peoples in the newly conquered lands on religious grounds.  When Columbus returned with indigenous slaves, they ordered the survivors to be returned to their homelands. In 1512, after pressure from Dominican friars, the Laws of Burgos were introduced to protect the rights of the natives in the New World and secure their freedom. The papal bull Sublimus Dei of 1537, to which Spain was committed, also officially banned enslavement of indigenous peoples, but it was rescinded a year after its promulgation. 

The other major form of coerced labor in their colonies, the encomienda system, was also abolished, despite the considerable anger this caused in the conquistador group who had expected to hold their grants in perpetuity.  It was replaced by the repartimiento system.

After passage of the 1542 New Laws, also known as the New Laws of the Indies for the Good Treatment and Preservation of the Indians, the Spanish greatly restricted the power of the encomienda system, allowed abuse by holders of the labor grants (encomenderos), and officially abolished the enslavement of the native population. However, indigenous people who rebelled against the Spanish could be enslaved, so that following the Mixtón War (1540-42) in northwest Mexico many indigenous slaves were captured and moved elsewhere in Mexico. The statutes of 1573, within the "Ordinances Concerning Discoveries," forbade unauthorized operations against independent Indian peoples. It required appointment of a "protector de indios", an ecclesiastical representative who acted as the protector of the Indians and represented them in formal litigation. Later in the 16th century, in Peru, thousands of indigenous men were forced to hard work as underground miners in the silver mines of Potosí, by means of the continuation of the pre-Hispanic Inca mita tradition.

Reinstatement of slavery for Mapuche rebels

King Philip III inherited a difficult situation in Chile, where the Arauco War raged and the local Mapuche succeeded in razing seven Spanish cities (1598–1604). An estimate by Alonso González de Nájera put the toll at 3000 Spanish settlers killed and 500 Spanish women taken into captivity by Mapuche. In retaliation the proscription against enslaving Indians captured in war was lifted by Philip in 1608. This decree was abused when Spanish settlers in Chiloé Archipelago used it to launch slave raids against groups such as the Chono of northwestern Patagonia who had never been under Spanish rule and never rebelled. The Real Audiencia of Santiago opined in the 1650s that slavery of Mapuches was one of the reasons for constant state of war between the Spanish and the Mapuche. Slavery for Mapuches "caught in war" was abolished in 1683 after decades of legal attempts by the Spanish Crown to suppress it.

Africans in the early colonial period

When Spain first enslaved Native Americans on Hispaniola, and then replaced them with captive Africans, it established slave labor as the basis for colonial sugar production. It was believed by Europeans that Africans had developed immunities to European diseases, and would not be as susceptible to fall ill as the Native Americans because they had not been exposed to the pathogens yet. In 1501, Spanish colonists began importing enslaved Africans from the Iberian Peninsula to their Santo Domingo colony on the island of Hispaniola. These first Africans, who had been enslaved in Europe before crossing the Atlantic, may have spoken Spanish and perhaps were even Christians. About 17 of them started in the copper mines, and about a hundred were sent to extract gold. As Old World diseases decimated Caribbean indigenous populations in the first decades of the 1500s, enslaved blacks from Africa (bozales) gradually replaced their labor, but they also mingled and joined in flights to freedom, creating mixed-race maroon communities in all the islands where Europeans had established chattel slavery. Slaves first arrived in Puerto Rico in 1511, after the Black conquistador Juan Garrido helped invade the island in 1508-1509. 

Spanish colonist turned Dominican friar Bartolomé de las Casas (1484–1566) observed and recorded the effects of enslavement on the Native populations. Initially he sought to protect the indigenous from enslavement by advocating and participating in the African slave trade. He later argued that enslavement of both indigenous and Africans was wrong, violating their human rights. Las Casas campaigned for protections of the indigenous, especially crown limits on the exploitation of the encomienda, helping to bring about the 1542 New Laws. 

In Spanish Florida and farther north, the first African slaves arrived in 1526 with Lucas Vázquez de Ayllón's establishment of San Miguel de Gualdape on the current Georgia coast.

They rebelled and lived with indigenous people, destroying the colony in less than 2 months.
More slaves arrived in Florida in 1539 with Hernando de Soto, and in the 1565 founding of St. Augustine, Florida.
Native Americans were also enslaved in Florida by the encomienda system.

Slaves escaping to Florida from the colony of Georgia were freed by Carlos II's proclamation November 7, 1693 if the slaves were willing to convert to Catholicism,
and it became a place of refuge for slaves fleeing the Thirteen Colonies.

In this early period, enslaved African men were often labor bosses, overseeing indigenous labor. Franciscan Toribio de Benavente Motolinia (1482-1568), one of the First Twelve Franciscans to arrive in Mexico in 1524, considered blacks the Fourth Plague on Mexican Indians. He wrote "In the first years these black overseers were so absolute in their maltreatment of the Indians, over-loading them, sending them far from their land and giving them many other tasks that many Indians died because of them and at their hands, which is the worst feature of the situation."  In Yucatan, there were regulations attempting to prevent blacks presence in indigenous communities. In Mexico City in 1537, a number of blacks were accused of rebellion. They were executed in the main plaza (zócalo) by hanging, an event recorded in an indigenous pictorial and alphabetic manuscript. 

Demand for African slaves was high and the slave trade was controlled by the Portuguese, who set up trading posts on the west coast of Africa. Spanish colonists purchased them directly from Portuguese traders, who in turn purchased them from African traders on the Atlantic coast. With the increased dependency on enslaved Africans and with the Spanish crown opposed to enslavement of indigenous, except in the case of rebellion, slavery became associated with race and racial hierarchy, with Europeans hardening their concepts of racial ideologies. These were buttressed by prior ideologies of differentiation as that of the limpieza de sangre (en: purity of blood), which in Spain referred to individuals without the perceived taint of Jewish or Muslim ancestry. However, in Spanish America, purity of blood came to mean a person free of any African ancestry.

In the vocabulary of the time, each enslaved African who arrived at the Americas was called "Pieza de Indias" (en: a piece of the Indies). The crown issued licenses "asientos", to merchants to specifically trade slaves, regulating the trade.  During the 16th century, the Spanish colonies were the most important customers of the Atlantic slave trade, claiming several thousands in sales, but other European colonies soon dwarfed these numbers when their demand for enslaved workers began to drive the slave market to unprecedented levels.

Some of the first black people in the Americas were "Atlantic Creoles", as the charter generation is described by the American historian Ira Berlin. Mixed-race men of African and Portuguese/Spanish descent, some slaves and others free, sailed with Iberian ships and worked in the ports of Spain and Portugal; some were born in Europe, others in African ports as sons of Portuguese trade workers and African women. African slaves were also taken to Portugal, where they married local women.  The mixed-race men often grew up bilingual, making them useful as interpreters in African and Iberian ports.

Some famous black Spanish soldiers in the first stages of the Spanish conquest of America were Juan Valiente and Juan Beltrán in Chile, Juan Garrido (credited with the first harvesting of wheat planted in New Spain) and Sebastián Toral in Mexico, Juan Bardales in Honduras and Panama, and Juan García in Peru.

The first known and recorded Christian marriage anywhere in the continental United States was an interracial union between a free black Spanish woman from Jerez de la Frontera and a Spanish settler from Segovia who met in Seville and embarked together as a couple to the New World. This marriage took place in 1565 in the Spanish settlement of St. Augustine, Florida.

Estevanico, recorded as a black slave from Morocco, survived the disastrous Narváez expedition from 1527 to 1536 when most of the men died. After the ships, horses, equipment and finally most of the men were lost, with three other survivors, Estevanico spent six years traveling overland from present-day Texas to Sinaloa, and finally reaching the Spanish settlement at Mexico City. He learned several Native American languages in the process. He went on to serve as a well-respected guide.  Later, while leading an expedition in what is now New Mexico in search of the Seven Cities of Gold, he was killed in a dispute with the Zuñi local people.

Black slavery in the late colonial period
The population of slaves in Cuba received a large boost when the British captured Havana during the Seven Years' War, and imported 10,000 slaves from their other colonies in the West Indies to work on newly established agricultural plantations. These slaves were left behind when the British returned Havana to the Spanish as part of the 1763 Treaty of Paris, and form a significant part of the Afro-Cuban population today. 

While historians have studied the production of sugar on plantations by enslaved workers in nineteenth-century Cuba, they have sometimes overlooked the crucial role of the Spanish state before the 1760s. Cuba ultimately developed two distinct but interrelated sources using enslaved labor, which converged at the end of the eighteenth century. The first of these sectors was urban and was directed in large measure by the needs of the Spanish colonial state, reaching its height in the 1760s. As of 1778, it was reported by Thomas Kitchin that "about 52,000 slaves" were being brought from Africa to the West Indies by Europeans, with approximately 4,000 being brought by the Spanish.

The second sector, which flourished after 1790, was rural and was directed by private slaveholders/planters involved in the production of export agricultural commodities, especially sugar. After 1763, the scale and urgency of defense projects led the state to deploy many of its enslaved workers in ways that were to anticipate the intense work regimes on sugar plantations in the nineteenth century. Another important group of workers enslaved by the Spanish colonial state in the late eighteenth century were the king's laborers, who worked on the city's fortifications.

The Spanish colonies were late to exploit slave labor in the production of sugarcane, particularly on Cuba.  The Spanish colonies in the Caribbean were among the last to abolish slavery. While the British abolished slavery by 1833, Spain abolished slavery in Puerto Rico in 1873. On the mainland of colonies, Spain ended African slavery in the eighteenth century. Peru was one of the countries that revived the institution for some decades after declaring independence from Spain in the early 19th century.

Fugitive slaves in Spanish territories

On May 29, 1680 the Spanish crown decreed that slaves escaping to Spanish territories from Barlovento, Martinique, San Vicente and Granada in the Lesser Antilles would be free if they accepted Catholicism. On September 3, 1680 and June 1, 1685 the crown issued similar decrees for escaping French slaves. On November 7, 1693 King Carlos II issued a decree freeing all slaves escaping from the English colonies who accepted Catholicism. There were similar decrees October 29, 1733, March 11 and November 11, 1740, and September 24, 1850 in the Buen Retiro by Ferdinand VI and the Royal Decree of October 21, 1753.

Since 1687, Spanish Florida attracted numerous African slaves who escaped from slavery in the Thirteen Colonies. Since 1623 the official Spanish policy had been that all slaves who touched Spanish soil and asked for refuge could become free Spanish citizens, and would be assisted in establishing their own workshops if they had a trade or given a grant of land to cultivate if they were farmers. In exchange they would be required to convert to Catholicism and serve for a number of years in the Spanish militia. Most were settled in a community called Gracia Real de Santa Teresa de Mose, the first settlement of free Africans in North America. The enslaved African Francisco Menéndez escaped from South Carolina and traveled to St. Augustine, Florida, where he became the leader of the settlers at Mose and commander of the black militia company there from 1726 until sometime after 1742.

The former slaves also found refuge among the Creek and Seminole, Native Americans who had established settlements in Florida at the invitation of the Spanish government. In 1771, Governor of Florida John Moultrie wrote to the Board of Trade, "It has been a practice for a good while past, for negroes to run away from their Masters, and get into the Indian towns, from whence it proved very difficult to get them back." When colonial officials asked the Native Americans to return the fugitive slaves, they replied that they had "merely given hungry people food, and invited the slaveholders to catch the runaways themselves."

After the American Revolutionary War, slaves from the state of Georgia and the Low Country of South Carolina escaped to Florida. The U.S. Army led increasingly frequent incursions into Spanish territory, including the 1817–1818 campaign by Andrew Jackson that became known as the First Seminole War. The United States afterwards effectively controlled East Florida (from the Atlantic to the Appalachicola River). According to Secretary of State John Quincy Adams, the US had to take action there because Florida had become "a derelict open to the occupancy of every enemy, civilized or savage, of the United States, and serving no other earthly purpose than as a post of annoyance to them.". Spain requested British intervention, but London declined to assist Spain in the negotiations. Some of President James Monroe's cabinet demanded Jackson's immediate dismissal, but Adams realized that Jackson's actions had put the U.S. in a favorable diplomatic position. Adams negotiated very favorable terms.

As Florida had become a burden to Spain, which could not afford to send settlers or garrisons, the Crown decided to cede the territory to the United States. It accomplished this through the Adams–Onís Treaty in 1819, effective 1821.

Ending of slavery

Support for abolitionism rose in Great Britain. Slavery in France's Caribbean colonies was abolished by Revolutionary decree in 1794, (slavery in Metropolitan France was abolished in 1315 by Louis X) but was restored under Napoleon I in 1802. Slaves in Saint-Domingue revolted in response and became independent following a brutal conflict. The victorious former slaves founded the republic of Haiti in 1804.

Later slave revolts were arguably part of the upsurge of liberal and democratic values centered on individual rights and liberties which came in the aftermath of the Enlightenment and the French Revolution in Europe. As emancipation became more of a concrete reality, the slaves' concept of freedom changed. No longer did they seek to overthrow the whites and re-establish carbon-copy African societies as they had done during the earlier rebellions; the vast majority of slaves were creole, native born where they lived, and envisaged their freedom within the established framework of the existing society.

The Spanish American wars of independence emancipated most of the overseas territories of Spain; in the Americas, various nations emerged from these wars. The wars were influenced by the ideas of the Age of Enlightenment and economic affairs, which also led to the reduction and ending of feudalism. For example, in Mexico on 6 December 1810, Miguel Hidalgo, leader of the independence movement, issued a decree abolishing slavery, threatening those who did not comply with death. In South America Simon Bolivar abolished slavery in the lands that he conquered. However, it was not a unified process. Some countries, including Peru and Ecuador, reintroduced slavery for some time after achieving independence.

In the treaty of 1814, King Ferdinand VII of Spain promised to consider means for abolishing the slave trade. In the treaty of September 23, 1817, with Great Britain, the Spanish Crown said that "having never lost sight of a matter so interesting to him and being desirous of hastening the moment of its attainment, he has determined to co-operate with His Britannic Majesty in adopting the cause of humanity." The king bound himself "that the slave trade will be abolished in all the dominions of Spain, May 30, 1820, and that after that date it shall not be lawful for any subject of the crown of Spain to buy slaves or carry on the slave trade upon any part of the coast of Africa." The date of final suppression was October 30. The subjects of the king of Spain were forbidden to carry slaves for any one outside the Spanish dominions, or to use the flag to cover such dealings.

The Assembly of Year XIII (1813) of the United Provinces of the Río de la Plata declared the freedom of wombs. It did not end slavery completely, but emancipated the children of slaves. Many slaves gained emancipation by joining the armies, either against royalists during the War of Independence, or during the later Civil Wars. For example, the Argentine Confederation ended slavery definitely with the sanction of the Argentine Constitution of 1853.

See also

Abolitionism
Afro-Mexicans
Atlantic slave trade
European colonization of the Americas
History of slavery in New Mexico
India Juliana
Slavery in the British and French Caribbean
Slavery in Latin America
Slavery in Spain
Peon
Race and ethnicity in Latin America

Further reading

Primary sources

Las Casas, Bartolomé de, The Devastation of the Indies, Johns Hopkins University Press, Baltimore & London, 1992.
Las Casas, Bartolomé de, History of the Indies, translated by Andrée M. Collard, Harper & Row Publishers, New York, 1971,
Las Casas, Bartolomé de, In Defense of the Indians, translated by Stafford Poole, C.M., Northern Illinois University, 1974.

Secondary readings

 Aguirre Beltán, Gonzalo. La población negra de México, 1519-1819: Un estudio etnohistórico. Mexico: Fondo de Cultura Económica, 1972, 1946.
 Aimes, Hubert H. A History of Slavery in Cuba 1511 to 1868, New York, NY : Octagon Books Inc, 1967.
Bennett, Herman Lee. Africans in Colonial Mexico. Bloomington: Indiana University Press, 2005.
Blackburn, Robin. The Making of New World Slavery: From the Baroque to the Modern,1492-1800. New York: Verso 1997.
Blanchard, Peter, Under the flags of freedom : slave soldiers and the wars of independence in Spanish South America. Pittsburgh: University of Pittsburgh Press, c2008.
Bowser, Frederick. The African Slave in Colonial Peru, 1524-1650. Stanford: Stanford University Press, 1974.
 Bush, Barbara. Slave Women in Caribbean Society, London: James Currey Ltd, 1990. 
 Carroll, Patrick James. Blacks in Colonial Veracruz: Race, Ethnicity, and Regional Development. Austin: University of Texas Press, 1991.
Curtin, Philip. The Atlantic Slave Trade: A Census. Madison: University of Wisconsin Press, 1969.
 Davidson, David M. "Negro Slave Control and Resistance in Colonial Mexico, 1519-1650." Hispanic American Historical Review 46 no. 3 (1966): 235–53.
 Diaz Soler, Luis Manuel "Historia De La Esclavitud Negra en Puerto Rico (1950)". LSU Historical Dissertations and Theses
 Ferrer, Ada. Insurgent Cuba: race, nation, and revolution, 1868-1898, Chapel Hill; London: University of North Carolina Press, 1999.
 Figueroa, Luis A. Sugar, Slavery, and Freedom in Nineteenth-Century Puerto Rico. University of North Carolina Press, 2006.
Foner, Laura, and Eugene D. Genovese, eds. Slavery in the New World: A Reader in Comparative History. Englewood Cliffs NJ: Prentice Hall, 1969.
 Fuente, Alejandro de la. "Slave Law and Claims Making in Cuba: The Tannenbaum Debate Revisited." Law and History Review (2004): 339–69.
Fuente, Alejandro de la. "From Slaves to Citizens? Tannenbaum and the Debates on Slavery, Emancipation, and Race Relations in Latin America," International Labor and Working-Class History 77 no. 1 (2010), 154–73.
Fuente, Alejandro de la. "Slaves and the Creation of Legal Rights in Cuba: Coartación and Papel", Hispanic American Historical Review 87, no. 4 (2007): 659–92.
 García Añoveros, Jesús María. El pensamiento y los argumentos sobre la esclavitud en Europa en el siglo XVI y su aplicación a los indios americanos y a lost negros africanos. Corpus Hispanorum de Pace. Madrid: Consejo Superior de Investigaciones Científicas, 2000.
Geggus, David Patrick. "Slave Resistance in the Spanish Caribbean in the Mid-1790s," in A Turbulent Time: The French Revolutionn and the Greater Caribbean, David Barry Gaspar and David Patrick Geggus. Bloomington: Indiana University Press 1997, pp. 130–55.
Gibbings, Julie. "In the Shadow of Slavery: Historical Time, Labor, and Citizenship in Nineteenth-Century Alta Verapaz, Guatemala", Hispnaic American Historical Review 96.1, (February 2016): 73–107.
 Grandin, Greg. The Empire of Necessity: Slavery, Freedom, and Deception in the New World, Macmillan, 2014.
Gunst, Laurie. "Bartolomé de las Casas and the Question of Negro Slavery in the Early Spanish Indies." PhD dissertation, Harvard University 1982.
Helg, Aline, Liberty and Equality in Caribbean Colombia, 1770-1835. Chapel Hill: University of North Carolina Press, 2004.
Heuman, Gad, and Trevor Graeme Burnard, eds. The Routledge History of Slavery. New York: Taylor and Francis, 2011.
Hünefeldt, Christine. Paying the Price of Freedom: Family and Labor among Lima's Slaves, 1800-1854. Berkeley and Los Angeles: University of California Press 1994.
 Johnson, Lyman L. "Manumission in Colonial Buenos Aires, 1776-1810." Hispanic American Historical Review 59, no. 2 (1979): 258-79.
 Johnson, Lyman L. "A Lack of Legitimate Obedience and Respect: Slaves and Their Masters in the Courts of Late Colonial Buenos Aires," Hispanic American Historical Review 87, no. 4 (2007), 631–57.
Klein, Herbert S. The Middle Passage: Comparative Studies in the Atlantic Slave Trade. Princeton: Princeton University Press, 1978.
 Klein, Herbert S., and Ben Vinson III. African Slavery in Latin America and the Caribbean. New York: Cambridge University Press, 2009.
Landers, Jane. Black Society in Spanish Florida. Urbana: University of Illinois Press, 1999.
Landers, Jane and Barry Robinson, eds. Slaves, Subjects, and Subversives: Blacks in Colonial Latin America. Albuquerque: University of New Mexico Press, 2006.
 Lockhart, James. Spanish Peru, 1532–1560: A Colonial Society. Madison: University of Wisconsin Press, 1968.
Love, Edgar F. "Negro Resistance to Spanish Rule in Colonial Mexico," Journal of Negro History 52, no. 2 (April 1967), 89–103.
 Mondragón Barrios, Lourdes. Esclavos africanos en la Ciudad de México: el servicio doméstico durante el siglo XVI. Mexico: Ediciones Euroamericanas, 1999.
O'Toole, Rachel Sarah. Bound Lives: Africans, Indians, and the Making of Race in Colonial Peru. Pittsburgh: University of Pittsburgh Press 2012.
 Palacios Preciado, Jorge. La trata de negros por Cartagena de Indias, 1650-1750. Tunja: Universidad Pedagógica y Tecnológica de Colombia, 1973.
 Palmer, Colin. Slaves of the White God: Blacks in Mexico, 1570-1650. Cambridge: Harvard University Press, 1976.
Palmer, Colin. Human Cargoes: The British Slave Trade to Spanish America, 1700-1739. Urbana: University of Illinois Press, 1981. 
 Proctor, Frank T., III "Damned Notions of Liberty": Slavery, Culture and Power in Colonial Mexico. Albuquerque: University of New Mexico Press, 2010.
 Proctor III, Frank T. "Gender and Manumission of Slaves in New Spain," Hispanic American Historical Review 86, no. 2 (2006), 309–36.
 
Restall, Matthew, and Jane Landers, "The African Experience in Early Spanish America," The Americas 57, no. 2 (2000), 167–70.
Rout, Leslie B. The African Experience in Spanish America, 1502 to the Present Day. New York: Cambridge University Press, 1976.
 Seijas, Tatiana. Asian Slaves in Colonial Mexico: From Chinos to Indians. New York: Cambridge University Press, 2014.
Sharp, William Frederick. Slavery on the Spanish Frontier: The Colombian Chocó, 1680-1810. Norman: University of Oklahoma Press, 1976.
Sierra Silva, Pablo Miguel. Urban Slavery in Colonial Mexico: Puebla de los Angeles, 1531-1706. New York: Cambridge University Press 2018.
 Shepherd, Verene A., ed. Slavery Without Sugar. Gainesville, FL: University Press of Florida, 2002. Print.
Solow, Barard I. ed., Slavery and the Rise of the Atlantic System. Cambridge: Cambridge University Press, 1991.
Tannenbaum, Frank. Slave and Citizen: The Negro in the Americas. New York Vintage Books, 1947.
Toplin, Robert Brent. Slavery and Race Relations in Latin America. Westport CT: Greenwood Press, 1974.
Vinson, Ben, III, and Matthew Restall, eds. Black Mexico: Race and Society from Colonial to Modern Times. Albuquerque: University of New Mexico Press, 2009.
Walker, Tamara J. "He Outfitted His Family in Notable Decency: Slavery, Honour, and Dress in Eighteenth-Century Lima, Peru," Slavery & Abolition 30, no. 3 (2009), 383–402.

Notes

External links
African Laborers for a New Empire: Iberia, Slavery, and the Atlantic World (Lowcountry Digital Library)
First Blacks in the Americas: the African presence in the Dominican Republic (CUNY Dominican Studies Institute)
North American Slavery in the Spanish and English colonies(Mission San Luis)
Slavery Contract (PortCities UK)
Slavery and Spanish Colonization (University of Houston, Digital History)

References

Further reading

Encomenderos
Spanish colonization of the Americas
History of the Americas
Latin American studies
Native American history of California
Slavery of Native Americans
Slavery in the Spanish Empire